Rolepa sicyata is a moth in the Phiditiidae family. It was discovered by Paul Dognin in 1901 in Santa-Cruz, Brazil. Dognin describes this moth as having yellow, green, and pale lilac hues.

References

Bombycoidea
Moths described in 1901